Wansford Road railway station was located in Northamptonshire serving the village of Wansford. It was some distance east of the village on the A47 road, although still nearer than the more important Wansford station of the London & North Western Railway. The station was built in 1867. 

Wansford Road station was on the Stamford and Essendine Railway line from Stamford to Wansford line which never really recovered from the 1926 general strike, and the whole line closed in 1929. The station building survived as a private residence.

When National Highways drew up plans to duplicate the A47 road, the station building lay in its path. In 2022 agreement was reached for the building to be dismantled and re-erected as the terminus of the Nene Valley Railway. The project will require an estimated £200,000 from the National Highways.

References

Buildings and structures in Peterborough
Disused railway stations in Cambridgeshire
Former Great Northern Railway stations
Nene Valley Railway
Railway stations in Great Britain opened in 1867
Railway stations in Great Britain closed in 1929
Transport in Peterborough